The 1996–97 Women's EHF Cup was the 15th edition of the competition, running from 11 October 1996 to 11 May 1997. Olimpija Ljubljana defeated Borussia Dortmund in the final to become the first Slovenian club to win the competition. Oțelul Galați (which defeated defending champion Debreceni VSC in the quarterfinals) and Vasas Budapest also reached the semifinals.

Qualifying round

Round of 16

Quarter-finals

Semifinals

Final

References

Women's EHF Cup
EHF Women's Cup
EHF Women's Cup